A binding post is a connector commonly used on electronic test equipment to terminate (attach) a single wire or test lead. They are also found on loudspeakers and audio amplifiers as well as other electrical equipment.

History
A binding post contains a central threaded metal rod and a cap that screws down on that rod. Binding posts slowly evolved from 19th century general purpose fasteners into 20th century electrical binding posts.  Examples of binding posts used during the 19th century are telegraph key and blasting machine devices.

Caps are commonly insulated with plastic and color-coded: red commonly means an active or positive terminal; black indicates an inactive (reference or return) or negative terminal; and green indicates an earth (ground) terminal.  Caps during the 19th century were typically bare metal until synthetic plastic, such as Bakelite, became available in the early 20th century.

During the late 1940s, General Radio created a new binding post that had a jack in a cap.  Today it is commonly known as a "five-way" or "universal" binding post, which allows many types of connection methods:
 Banana plugs, inserted into the top open end of the binding post.
 Bare wire inserted through the same hole and clamped.
 Bare wire wrapped around the metal post and clamped.
 Pin connector, inserted into a hole drilled through the metal post and clamped by the screw-down portion of the binding post.
 Alligator clip.

Safety 
Even so-called isolated binding posts are typically not sufficiently isolated to protect users from coming into contact with their metal parts carrying voltage. As such they are not suitable to be used for carrying dangerous voltages (cf. extra-low voltage). On several types of equipment it has been becoming common to no longer use the traditional binding posts, but safety banana jacks. The universal property of binding posts is lost here, since safety banana jacks can only be used with traditional and safety banana plugs.

In the past, it was common for multiple five-way binding posts to have their drilled holes lined up; this provided convenience in some applications as a bare wire could be strung from post to post to post. But this also impaired safety as two wires or pin connectors could be inserted from opposite sides of two binding posts and the tips of the wires or probes might inadvertently short together. Holes are now normally aligned in such a fashion that such shorts cannot occur.

Standard spacing 
In order to permit the use of double banana plugs, the most common distance between the centers of the plugs should be  inch (19.05 mm), which originated on General Radio test equipment during the 1920s, however  inch is not the only spacing.

See also 
 Banana connector
 Fahnestock clip — an earlier device, now largely supplanted by binding posts

References

External links 
 About.com glossary definition
 Binding Posts - Pomona Electronics

Electrical connectors